Hartmut Nickel (16 November 1944  27 June 2019) was a German ice hockey player, who competed for SC Dynamo Berlin. He played for the East Germany national ice hockey team at the 1968 Winter Olympics in Grenoble.

References

1944 births
2019 deaths
German ice hockey players
Ice hockey players at the 1968 Winter Olympics
Olympic ice hockey players of East Germany
People from Weißwasser
SC Dynamo Berlin (ice hockey) players
Sportspeople from Saxony